The British Journal of Hospital Medicine is a monthly peer-reviewed medical journal principally aimed at hospital-based healthcare professionals. It was established in 1966 as Hospital Medicine, changing name to British Journal of Hospital Medicine from 1968 to 1997. In 1998, it changed back to Hospital Medicine, and returned to British Journal of Hospital Medicine in 2006. It is currently published by Mark Allen Publishing. The editor-in-chief is Rob Miller.

Content

The journal publishes editorials, case reports, clinical reviews, quality improvement projects, and symposia, as well as completed audits which follow the SQUIRE (Standards for QUality Improvement Reporting Excellence) guidelines.
In addition, the journal includes a Doctors in Training section that includes papers aimed specifically for medical practitioners in core and specialist training in four categories:
Clinical skills for postgraduate examinations
What you need to know about
Tips from the shop floor
What they don't teach you in medical school

Abstracting and indexing
The journal is abstracted and indexed in:

According to the Journal Citation Reports, the journal has a 2019 impact factor of 0.429.

See also

List of medical journals

References

External links

1966 establishments in the United Kingdom
English-language journals
General medical journals
Hybrid open access journals
Monthly journals
Publications established in 1966